Jorge Gabriel Toledo Jofré (born 3 February 1975) is a Chilean former professional footballer who played as an attacking midfielder for clubs in Chile and Asia.

Career
A left-footed attacking midfielder, Toledo played for Fernández Vial and Huachipato in his homeland before emigrating to Indonesia.

In Indonesia, he played between 2003 and 2007, with a stint with Fernández Vial in 2004. As a player of PSM Makassar, he coincided with his compatriot Oscar Aravena. In Persmin Minahasa, he coincided with another compatriot, Daniel Campos. His last club in that country was Persitara North Jakarta., 

In 2007, he spent some months in the Thai football before returning to Chile and joining Municipal Iquique. 

After he played for Ñublense and Deportes Concepción. In 2010, he took part in the Copa Chile Bicentenario as a member of Club Deportivo y Social Lord Cochrane from Concepción, Chile.

Honours
A historical player of Fernández Vial, in 2020 Toledo was selected in the reserve bench of the ideal team of all time by the club fans.

References

External links
 
 
 

1975 births
Living people
Place of birth missing (living people)
Chilean footballers
Chilean expatriate footballers
C.D. Arturo Fernández Vial footballers
C.D. Huachipato footballers
PSM Makassar players
Persmin Minahasa players
Persitara Jakarta Utara players
Deportes Iquique footballers
Ñublense footballers
Deportes Concepción (Chile) footballers
Primera B de Chile players
Chilean Primera División players
Indonesian Premier Division players
Chilean expatriate sportspeople in Indonesia
Chilean expatriate sportspeople in Thailand
Expatriate footballers in Indonesia
Expatriate footballers in Thailand
Association football midfielders